The 61st Mountain Troops Brigade "General Virgil Bădulescu" (Brigada 61 Vânători de Munte) is a mountain troops brigade of the Romanian Land Forces. It was formed in October 1991. The brigade is currently subordinated to the 4th Infantry Division and its headquarters are located in Miercurea Ciuc.

Organization 2020 
 61st Mountain Hunters Brigade "Virgil Bădulescu", in Miercurea Ciuc
 17th Mountain Hunters Battalion "Dragoș Vodă", in Vatra Dornei
 22nd Mountain Hunters Battalion "Cireșoaia", in Sfântu Gheorghe
 24th Mountain Hunters Battalion "General Gheorghe Avramescu", in Miercurea Ciuc
 385th Artillery Battalion "Iancu de Hunedoara", in Odorheiu Secuiesc
 468th Anti-aircraft Artillery Battalion "Trotuș", in Lunca de Sus
 435th Logistic Support Battalion "Ciuc", in Miercurea Ciuc

External links and References

   Official Site of the Romanian Land Forces
  Official Site of the 4th Infantry Division 

Brigades of Romania
Mountain infantry brigades